The United Kingdom of Great Britain and Northern Ireland competed at the 1988 Winter Paralympics held in Innsbruck, Austria. The team was known by its shortened name of Great Britain, for identification purposes. The team did not win any medals during these games.

See also
Great Britain at the Paralympics
Great Britain at the 1988 Winter Olympics

References

External links
International Paralympic Committee official website

Nations at the 1988 Winter Paralympics
1988
Paralympics
Winter sports in the United Kingdom